The Asian Women’s Leadership University (AWLU) Project (also known as the "AWLU Project") is an educational project formed in fall 2010 to establish a global women’s leadership university based in Asia. In summer 2011, the AWLU Project team determined that Malaysia would be the host country of the Asian Women's Leadership University (AWLU).

Projected to open in September 2021, the AWLU will be a private, not-for-profit university modeled on the U.S. “Seven Sisters” liberal arts and sciences colleges. The AWLU will combine American-style liberal arts and sciences education with leadership courses and a curriculum regionally relevant to Asia. AWLU will seek promising women from diverse backgrounds to be a part of its vibrant residential learning community.

History 
The Asian Women’s Leadership University (AWLU) Project was founded in 2010 when three Smith College graduates with roots in Asia met through the Smith alumni network. As beneficiaries of the positive impact of a Seven Sisters college education, the founders wanted to extend the positive impacts of a supportive and empowering education to young women outside of the United States. Through extensive discussions, the mission of AWLU was established: to build a global educational institution dedicated to empowering women from developing economies. It is envisioned that AWLU graduates will have more than a degree - they will have the leadership skills to promote cross-cultural understanding, regional development and international cooperation. The AWLU Project was put on hiatus in 2015 and was revived in 2019.

Current Progress 
The AWLU Project continues to gain international recognition and support in its effort to establish a global women's leadership university for women from Asia and the Middle East. The AWLU Project has secured the commitment of institutions such as Smith College to offer its executive education programmes and Mills College on curricular development and design. It is also currently partnered with the Women's Empowerment Institute (Institut Wanita Berdaya, or IWB), a policy development and research body, to look at the viability of a women’s leadership university in Malaysia and the Asian region. The research examines how such an institution can support a more gender-equitable leadership environment as well as provide innovative and effective pathways to social change.

All progress thus far has been achieved through a dedicated working Steering Committee, a distinguished group of senior leaders in Malaysia, and an enthusiastic set of global volunteers.

The AWLU Project's current priorities include securing the Malaysian Ministry of Education's license to establish the AWLU as an approved university in Malaysia. If such approval should be obtained, full fundraising and establishment efforts are expected to commence.

In November 2012, AWLU's rise was documented by the New York Times article "Leadership University Rises for Asian Women".  The AWLU Project has since been featured at the 2013 Harvard EdTalks and on GOOD Magazine's 2013 Top 100 List, among other features. The AWLU Project was incubated at the Harvard innovation lab during 2013 in Cambridge, MA.

Steering Committee
 (Tan Sri) Zarinah Anwar,  Co-Chair, AWLU Project Steering Committee; Chairman, Institute of Corporate Directors Malaysia; Former Chairman, Securities Commission Malaysia; Trustee, Razak School of Government; Trustee, Jeffrey Cheah Foundation; Trustee, Hasanah Foundation
 Khoo Hoon Eng, Co-Chair, AWLU Project Steering Committee; Trustee Emirata, Smith College, Former Provost and Acting Vice-Chancellor, Asian University for Women (Bangladesh); Associate Professor, Yong Loo Lin School of Medicine and Rector, Saga Residential College, Yale-NUS College, National University of Singapore
Johan Saravanamuttu, Secretary, AWLU Project Steering Committee; Emeritus Professor, Universiti Sains Malaysia, Penang; Adjunct Senior Fellow, Nanyang Technological University, Singapore
(Dato) Judy Cheng-Hopkins, Adjunct Professor, School of International and Public Affairs, Columbia University; Former Assistant Secretary General, UN Peacebuilding Support Office, New York; Former Assistant High Commissioner for Refugees, UNHCR, Geneva
Cecilia Ng Choon Sim, Honorary Professor, Universiti Sains Malaysia
Maznah Mohamad, Associate Professor, Head, Malay Studies Department, National University of Singapore

Corporate Partners

 T.R. Hamzah and Yeang Sdn Bhd, international architect firm based in Kuala Lumpur, Malaysia, best known for designing innovative signature green buildings and masterplans.

More Information 
www.awlu.org
 www.facebook.com/awluproject
 www.twitter.com/awluproject
 www.linkedin.com/groups/awluproject
 www.youtube.com/AWLUProject

Universities in Malaysia
Women's universities and colleges
Liberal arts colleges